Mariya Anatolyevna Ovchinnikova (born 19 October 1998 in Temirtau) is a Kazakhstani athlete specialising in the triple jump. She represented her country at the 2017 World Championships without advancing to the final. In addition, she won a gold medal at the 2017 Asian Championships.

International competitions

Personal bests

Outdoor
Long jump – 6.13 (+0.5 m/s, Almaty 2017)
Triple jump – 13.94 (0.0 m/s, Almaty 2017)

Indoor
Long jump – 5.92 (Kamenogorsk 2017)
Triple jump – 13.49 (Kamenogorsk 2017)

References

1998 births
Living people
Kazakhstani female triple jumpers
World Athletics Championships athletes for Kazakhstan
People from Temirtau
Competitors at the 2017 Summer Universiade
Competitors at the 2019 Summer Universiade
Athletes (track and field) at the 2020 Summer Olympics
Olympic athletes of Kazakhstan